Shrewsbury High School is a public high school located in Shrewsbury, Massachusetts, United States. It is the only public high school in the Shrewsbury Public Schools district.
It is a large school offering a wide variety of electives and extracurricular activities. Shrewsbury High School placed 27th in the list of 21,035 high schools that U.S News reviewed in 2013. The current principal is Todd Bazydlo. Shrewsbury High School is part of Shrewsbury Public Schools, the current superintendent of which is Dr. Joseph Sawyer.

History

The current campus, located on top of a hill on Holden Street, opened in 2002 with a capacity of 1,400 students, though enrollment has increased to 1835 students as of October 2021.

Prior to that it was located at what is now Oak Middle School on Oak Street, and before that was located at what is now Beal School on Maple Avenue.

Sports

The school also received the PEP Grant and has fleshed out the classes the school offers in its physical education programs. The new programs include biking and a ropes course.

The boys' hockey team won three state championships in five years between 2014 and 2018 (2014, 2017, and 2018). The boys beat Hanover in 2014 and 2018, and Old Rochester High School in 2017. Following their 2018 State Championship, they were promoted to Division I in Massachusetts High School Hockey, joining the division as an independent team not belonging to a conference.

Improvements to the athletic campus and to the playing and practice conditions of sports, is funded by the Athletic booster club. Shrewsbury High School's campus recently added a turf field, breaking ground in an informal ceremony on June 5, 2018. The new field accommodates lacrosse, soccer, football, field hockey, track and field, and cross country. Physical education class also utilizes the field. The addition of a turf field will hopefully reduce maintenance costs and also generate revenue, as youth sports programs, as well as games and jamborees can be hosted.

Clubs 
Shrewsbury High School offers the unique opportunity where if a sport is not offered, it can be created as a club then, eventually, if popular, can become a sport with proper support. The list of clubs includes:

Amnesty International
Anime Club
Asian Cultural Club
Astronomy Club
Behind the Sciences Club
Biology Club
Black History Committee
Book Club
Business Club
SHS Choirs/Orchestra/Band
Chemistry Club
SHS Chess Club
Club of Rock
Cooking with Chemistry
DECA
Destination Imagination
Dungeons & Dragons
Elementary Tutoring
ELNA
Engineering Club
Excelsior
FIRST Robotics Competition Team 467
German Club
Glee Club
GMAD
Green Club
Gender & Sexuality Alliance
Helping Hands
History
Improv Club
Marine Biology Club
Math Team
SHS MED Club
Model UN
Muslim Student Club
MVP
National Art Honor Society
National English Honors Society
National Honor Society
National Latin Honors Society
National Mandarin Honors Society
National Math Honors Society
National Social Sciences Honors Society
National Spanish Honor Society
NEAT
Outdoors Club
Photography Club
Physics Club
Political Action Group
SHS Quiz Team
Science Team
Service Learning
Sign Language Club
Ski Club
Special Peer Connection
Speech and Debate Team
SAC
Students Community Forum
Student Council
Town Crier
Tri-M
Ultimate Frisbee
Yearbook
Club Photo Galleries

Music and theater
Shrewsbury High School has 2 main sections of theater, the fall play and the spring musical. It used to do a competition play as well:

Shrewsbury High School won Best Overall Production for Urinetown in 2016 and Best Overall Production in the Large School Division for All Shook Up in 2018 and Seussical in 2019 in the TAMY awards

SHS offers a variety of music and theater classes and performing ensembles. The classes include: Music Theory I & AP Music Theory, Theater Arts, Movement for Theater, Theater Design, and Music Technology.

Wind performing ensembles under the direction of Mr. Justin Bleier: Pep Band, Marching Band, Concert Band, Honors Wind Ensemble, Honors Jazz Band

Vocal performing ensembles under the direction of Mr. Michael Lapomardo: Freshman Choir, Mixed Choir, Honors Treble Choir (previously named Honors Women's Choir), Honors A Capella

String performing ensembles: Shrewsbury High School Orchestra and Honors Chamber Orchestra under the direction of Mrs. Kate Mercadante

Advanced placement classes
Shrewsbury High School offers these advanced placement classes:

 AP Mandarin Chinese
 AP United States History
 AP Studio Art Drawing
 AP English Language and Composition
 AP English Literature and Composition
 AP Environmental Science
 AP Biology
 AP Physics
 AP Chemistry
 AP Statistics
 AP Calculus both AB and BC
 AP Psychology
 AP Human Geography
 AP Music Theory
 AP Spanish Language
 AP French Language
 AP Latin (only offered if enough demand)

Other advanced placement classes are offered in the Virtual High School program.

Notable alumni 
 Caleb Crain, Contributor to The New Yorker, author of the 2013 novel Necessary Errors
 Shawn Loiseau, Linebacker in the National Arena League

References

External links 

Shrewsbury Public Schools official website
Shrewsbury High Schools' official Alumni website

Schools in Worcester County, Massachusetts
Public high schools in Massachusetts
Buildings and structures in Shrewsbury, Massachusetts